Catch the Wind is a 1978 Soviet drama film directed by Vladimir Lyubomudrov.

Plot 
The manager of the stud farm with his daughter and her fiance are trying to avoid a civil war in the Ural steppes, but the war still comes to them.

Cast 
 Konstantin Grígoryev as Pavel (as Konstantin Grigorev)
 Pavel Kadochnikov as Sergey Sergeyevich
 Elena Proklova as Natasha
 Lev Prygunov as Viktor
 Aleksandr Porokhovshchikov as Captain
 Mikhail Kononov as Vaska
 Sergey Bachurskiy as Gavrya (as S. Bachurskiy)
 Aleksandr Yanvaryov as Uryadnik (as A. Yanyaryov)
 Nikolay Pogodin as Timofeyev (as N. Pogodin)
 Vitali Titov as Obechkin (as V. Titov)

References

External links 
 

1978 films
1970s Russian-language films
Soviet drama films
1978 drama films